The 4th British Academy Film Awards, given by the British Academy of Film and Television Arts and honoured the best films of 1950.

All About Eve won the award for Best Film''.

Winners and nominees

Winners are listed first and highlighted in boldface; the nominees are listed below alphabetically and not in boldface.

See also
 8th Golden Globe Awards
 23rd Academy Awards

References

External links 
 The British Academy of Film and Television Arts Official website

Film004
1951 in British cinema
1950 film awards
February 1951 events in the United Kingdom
1951 in London